is a Japanese football player. He plays for Hokkaido Consadole Sapporo.

International career
On May 24, 2019, Suga has been called by Japan's head coach Hajime Moriyasu to feature in the Copa América played in Brazil.

Club statistics
Updated to 18 February 2019.

National team statistics

International goals
Scores and results list Japan's goal tally first.

References

External links

Profile at Consadole Sapporo

1998 births
Living people
Association football people from Hokkaido
Japanese footballers
J1 League players
J2 League players
Hokkaido Consadole Sapporo players
People from Otaru
Association football wingers
Association football fullbacks
Japan international footballers